Gérard Dédéyan (4 February 1942, Nantes) is a French professor of medieval history at the Paul Valéry University, Montpellier III, a member of the Armenian National Academy of Sciences and associate member of the Collège de France.

In 1983, Dédéyan won the Prix Biguet of the Académie Française for his "Histoire des Arméniens.
 
Professor Charles Dédéyan was his father.

Bibliography 
 Les pouvoirs arméniens dans le Proche-Orient Méditerranéen (1068-1144) 5 vol., doctoral thesis, Paris 1, 1990 .
 Smbat le Connétable, introduction, translation and notes by Gérard Dédéyan, La Chronique attribuée au connétable Smbat, Geuthner, Paris, 1980 .
 Les Arméniens, histoire d'une chrétienté, Privat, Toulouse, 1990 .
 et al., Arménie : 3000 ans d'histoire, Éditions Faton, coll. « Les Dossiers d'archéologie », n° 177, Dijon, 1992 .
 with Jacques Le Goff, La Méditerranée au temps de saint Louis, Aigues-Mortes colloquium, 25 and 26 April 1997, Éd. du SIVOM d'Aigues-Mortes, 2001 .
 (dir.), Les Arméniens entre Grecs, Musulmans et Croisés : étude sur les pouvoirs arméniens dans le Proche-Orient méditerranéen (1068–1150), 2 vol., Fundação Calouste Gulbenkian, Lisbonne, 2003 .
 with Isabelle Augé and Gérard Dédéyan (dir.), L'Église arménienne entre Grecs et Latins : fin XIe milieu Ve, Geuthner, Paris, 2009 .
 with Karam Rizk (dir.), Le comté de Tripoli : État multiculturel et multiconfessionnel, 1102–1289, actes des journées d'études, Université Saint-Esprit, Kaslik, Liban, December 2002, Geuthner, Paris, 2010 .
 Alphonse Cillière (presented by Gérard Dédéyan, Claire Mouradian and Yves Ternon), 1895 — Massacres d'Arméniens, Privat, coll. « Témoignages pour l'histoire », Toulouse, 2010 .
 Gérard Dédéyan, Carol Iancu, (dir.), Du génocide des arméniens à la Shoah : Typologie des massacres du XXe siècle, Privat, coll. « Regards sur l'histoire » Toulouse, 2015, 640p. .

References

External links 
 Gérard DÉDÉYAN on the site of the Académie Française
 Official website
 Page on Université Montpellier 3
 Histoire des Arméniens, 1982 (compte rendu) on Persée

20th-century French historians
21st-century French historians
French people of Armenian descent
Armenian studies scholars
Historians of the Armenian genocide
Writers from Nantes
1942 births
Living people
Academic staff of the University of Montpellier